{{Infobox animanga/Print
| type            = manga
| author          = Buncololi
| illustrator     = Pureji Osho
| publisher       = Kadokawa Shoten
| publisher_en    = 
| demographic     = Shōnen
| imprint         = 
| magazine        = Shōnen Ace Plus
| first           = January 22, 2021
| last            = 
| volumes         = 2
| volume_list     = 
}}

 is a Japanese light novel series written by Buncololi and illustrated by Kantoku. The series originally began serialization as a web novel on the novel posting websites Kakuyomu and Shōsetsuka ni Narō in December 2018, before beginning publication under Media Factory's MF Bunko J imprint in January 2021; five volumes have been released as of May 2022. A manga adaptation illustrated by Pureji Osho began serialization in Kadokawa Shoten's Shōnen Ace Plus online magazine in January 2021, and has been compiled into two tankōbon volumes as of June 2022. Both the light novel and manga are licensed in English by Yen Press. An anime television series adaptation has been announced.

Characters

Media
Light novel

Manga

Anime
An anime television series adaptation was announced during the "Natsu no Gakuensai 2022" event for MF Bunko J on July 24, 2022.

Reception
In the 2022 edition of Kono Light Novel ga Sugoi!, the series ranked first in the tankōbon'' and novel categories.

References

External links
 at Kakuyomu 
 at Shōsetsuka ni Narō 
 
 

2021 Japanese novels
Anime and manga based on light novels
Comedy anime and manga
Fantasy anime and manga
Isekai anime and manga
Isekai novels and light novels
Japanese fantasy novels
Japanese webcomics
Kadokawa Shoten manga
Light novels
Light novels first published online
MF Bunko J
Shōnen manga
Shōsetsuka ni Narō
Upcoming anime television series
Webcomics in print
Yen Press titles